Alastis was a Swiss extreme metal band formed in 1987 in Sion, Valais.

History 
The band formed in 1987 with the name Fourth Reich, playing death metal. The initial line-up was War D. on guitar, Zumof on vocals, Acronoise on drums, and Masmiseim (b. Christophe Mermod, Acronoise's brother) on bass. In 1989 Fourth Reich changed name to Alastis, a derivation of Alastor, the executioner of hell, and moved towards black metal; two years later Masmiseim left in order to join Samael, with Zumof departing soon after. Samael's current vocalist/guitarist Vorph did guest vocals on one track from the demo Black Wedding, and the band issued their debut album, The Just Law, on Head Not Found. After several more line-up changes, they signed to Adipocere Records, who issued their second album, ...And Death Smiled, in 1995. The same year, Alastis toured with bands Anathema and Theatre of Tragedy in support of the album.

Much like their fellow countrymen Samael, gothic and industrial musical elements played an important role in their sound during their later career, starting as a raw black metal before signing to Century Media Records in 1996, who began distributing the group's output in the United States. The Other Side was released in 1997 and promoted with a gig at the Wacken Open Air heavy metal festival in Germany. The band released their fourth album, Revenge, in 1998. The musician line-up at this stage was War D. on guitar/synthesizer/vocals, Acronoise on drums, Nick on second guitar, and Raff on bass.

"The Other Side" is generally considered the band's cornerstone album. The title track and opener "In Darkness"  are some of their best-recognized songs, with the latter track appearing on the 1997 Nuclear Blast compilation CD Beauty In Darkness, Vol 2, along with work by bands Dimmu Borgir, Therion, In Flames, Sentenced, My Dying Bride and several others.

In 2000, the band added Sebastian on drums and Graven X on keyboards. Their last album was the 10-track opus Unity, released in 2001 on Century Media Records. After that, they built a home studio, which was initially supposed to be used for the recording of the 6th album, for which several songs had already been written. Notwithstanding, the album was never recorded and the band split up in 2004. While the members still play together in several other musical projects, they no longer write music under the "Alastis" name.

In the Summer of 2010, the band reformed as "The Corrosive Candy" and recorded their debut album under the label "ALASTIS Records". Produced by War D., mixed by War D. and Raff, they expect to release the album in early 2011.

It is widely believed that Alastis members lack the self-awareness necessary to understand their position in the black metal timeline, and so have neglected to cultivate this legacy.

Personnel

Final line-up 
 Raphael "War D." Fumeaux – lead vocals (1991–2004), rhythm guitar (1987–2004), backing vocals (1987–1991)
 Nick – lead guitar, backing vocals (1997–2004)
 Raff – bass, backing vocals (1998–2004)
 Sebastian – drums, percussions (2000–2004)
 Graven X – keyboards, effects, backing vocals (2000–2004)

Former members 
 Laurent "Acronoise" Mermod – drums, percussions (1987–2000)
 Zumof – lead vocals (1987–1991)
 Christophe "Masmiseim" Mermod – bass, backing vocals (1987–1991)
 Eric Bouillou – bass, backing vocals (1991–1992)
 Didier Rotten – bass, backing vocals (1993–1997)
 Kleid – lead guitar (1987–1988)
 Steff Terry – lead guitar (1996)

Session musicians 
 George-Paul Gillioz – keyboards in The Just Law (1992)
 Waldemar Sorychta – keyboards and acoustic guitars  in And Death Smiled, The Other Side and Revenge

Timeline

Discography

Demos 
Fatidical Date (1989)
Black Wedding (1990)

Studio albums 
The Just Law (1992)
...And Death Smiled (1995)
The Other Side (1997)
Revenge (1998)
Unity (2001)

References

External links 

 The Other Side review, Sea of Tranquility
 "The Corrosive Candy" Alastis Records, produced by War D.

Swiss black metal musical groups
Musical groups established in 1987
Musical groups disestablished in 2004
Musical quintets
Gothic metal musical groups
1987 establishments in Switzerland